Tarache dacia, the brown cotton leafworm, is a species of bird dropping moth in the family Noctuidae.

The MONA or Hodges number for Tarache dacia is 9144.

References

Further reading

 
 
 

Acontiinae
Articles created by Qbugbot
Moths described in 1889